The 2013 National Club Baseball Association (NCBA) Division II Tournament was a post-season tournament for the best teams in the NCBA during the 2013 season. 28 NCBA Division II college baseball teams met after playing their way through the regular season to play in the NCBA Tournament. The tournament culminated with eight teams competing for the 2013 NCBA Division II World Series at Brooks Stadium in Paducah, KY.

Districts
The opening rounds of the tournament were played across eight pre-determined sites across the country, each consisting of a four-team field except for Districts VII and VIII, which consisted of a two-team best-of-three format. All other districts were double elimination. The winner of each district advanced to the NCBA Division II World Series.

District I
at Erie, PA

Since Penn State and West Virginia were from the same conference therefore the two teams could not meet in the first round.

District II
at Warwick, RI

District III
at Martinsville, VA

District IV
at Clemson, SC

Kennesaw State and Alabama were from the same conference and therefore could not play in the first round.

District V
at Sheboygan, WI

District VI
at Huntingburg, IN

District VII
at Houston, TX

District VIII
at Fort Collins, CO

NCBA Division II World Series

References

2013 in baseball
National Club Baseball Association